Missing Pieces is a 1992 comedy film written and directed by Leonard Stern. Eric Idle plays a former greeting-card writer whose possible inheritance causes him great distress.

Plot

Eric Idle and Robert Wuhl star as a mismatched couple, Wendel and Lou, in this mystery-comedy film. Supporting characters include a one-handed kingpin, a lawyer who suffers from dwarfism, and twin brothers - one a crazed photographer and the other a mild-mannered antique dealer. When one of Wendel's many former foster parents, Mr. Hu, dies, Wendel is bequeathed a riddle as his inheritance. Wendel and his cello-playing best friend Lou soon realise that the riddle isn't Hu's heirloom, just the key to finding Wendel's true inheritance. In the course of solving the riddle, they are pursued by several unfavourable characters, almost all of whom want them dead.

Cast
 Eric Idle - Wendel
 Robert Wuhl - Lou Wimpole
 Lauren Hutton - Jennifer
 Bob Gunton - Mr. Gabor
 Richard Belzer - Baldesari
 Bernie Kopell - Dr. Gutman
 Kim Lankford - Sally
 Donald Gibb - Hurrudnik
 Leslie Jordan - Krause
 Louis Zorich - Ochenko
 Don Hewitt - Scarface
 John de Lancie - Paul / Walter Thackary
 James Hong - Chang
 Janice Lynde - Marion
 Mary Fogarty - Mrs. Callahan (as Mary Fogerty)

Reception
The film opened in theatres on July 17, 1992 and was available on DVD from 20 August 1996. Also, on HBO Video.

External links
 
 

1992 films
1990s comedy mystery films
American comedy mystery films
1990s English-language films
Films scored by Marvin Hamlisch
Universal Pictures films
1992 comedy films
1990s American films